Zatrephes fallax is a moth of the family Erebidae. It was described by Paul Dognin in 1923. It is found in Brazil and French Guiana.

References

Phaegopterina
Moths described in 1923